In baseball, an ace is a starting pitcher considered the best pitcher on a team and nearly always the first pitcher in the team's starting rotation. Barring injury or exceptional circumstances, an ace typically starts on Opening Day. In addition, aces are usually preferred to start crucial playoff games, sometimes on three days' rest.

The term may be a derivation of the nickname of Asa Brainard (real first name: "Asahel"), a 19th-century star pitcher, who was sometimes referred to as "Ace".

In the early days of baseball, the term ace was used to refer to a run.

Modern baseball analysts and fans have started using the term ace to refer to the elite pitchers in the game, not necessarily to the best starting pitcher on each team. For example, the April 27, 1981, Sports Illustrated cover was captioned "The Amazing A's and Their Five Aces" to describe the starting rotation of the 1981 Oakland Athletics.

References

Baseball pitching
Baseball strategy